H20 (H twenty) may refer to:
 HMS H20, a submarine
 McDonnell XH-20 Little Henry, a type of helicopter
 Nissan H20, a type of engine
 Xian H-20, a Chinese stealth bomber
 Halloween H20: 20 Years Later, a 1998 horror sequel
 H20, the ICD-10 code for uveitis

See also 
 H2O (disambiguation)